KWPX-TV, virtual and UHF digital channel 33, is an Ion Television owned-and-operated station serving Seattle and Tacoma, Washington, United States that is licensed to Bellevue. The station is owned by the Ion Media subsidiary of the E. W. Scripps Company. KWPX-TV's offices are located on 304th Avenue Southeast in Preston, and its transmitter is located on West Tiger Mountain near Issaquah.

History
The station signed on the air as KBGE on May 17, 1989. Its original transmitter site was atop Columbia Center; the transmitter was later moved to West Tiger Mountain. The call letters became KWPX-TV on March 9, 1998, after the station was purchased by Paxson Communications, replacing ValueVision with its inTV network until the launch of Pax on August 31, 1998. The station was never a part of the early-2000s initiative by NBC to rebroadcast local newscasts a half-hour later on a Pax station, as KING-TV already featured newscasts on sister station KONG-TV.

Until 2021, the station carried Telemundo on its seventh subchannel, before Scripps' purchase of Ion Media nullified the agreement, in order to carry their own subchannel networks. Cox-owned KIRO-TV relaunched the network in the market in the fall of 2022 over subchannel 7.4.

Technical information

Subchannels
The station's digital signal is multiplexed:

Analog-to-digital conversion
KWPX-TV shut down its analog signal, over UHF channel 33, on February 17, 2009, to conclude the federally mandated transition from analog to digital television. The station's digital signal relocated from its pre-transition UHF channel 32 to frequency, channel 33.

References

External links

WPX-TV
Ion Television affiliates
Court TV affiliates
Bounce TV affiliates
Grit (TV network) affiliates
Defy TV affiliates
TrueReal affiliates
Scripps News affiliates
E. W. Scripps Company television stations
1989 establishments in Washington (state)
Television channels and stations established in 1989